Nelavanka is a 1983 Indian Telugu-language film directed by Jandhyala.

Cast
Gummadi as Srirama Raju
J. V. Somayajulu as Raheem
Rajesh as Saleem
Kiran as Kiran
Tulasi as Lalita
Rajyalakshmi as Savitri
Master Ali as Ali
Muddali Susheela as Rameswari
C. Rammohana Rao as Srirama Raju's brother
K. Sambasiva Rao as Seshayya, servant
Prameela Rani as Srirama Raju's wife
Potti Prasad as Gurrala Guravayya
Eswara Rao as Ravi
Suthivelu as Dongre Sastry, Ayurveda doctor 
Sutti Veerabhadra Rao as Dongre Sastry's compounder
Gangarathnam as Raheem's mother
Sakshi Ranga Rao

Crew
Producer - A. S. Anjaneyulu, M. Narasimha Rao
Story, Screenplay and Direction - Jandhyala
Co-Director - U. V. Pani
Associate Directors - E. V. V. Satyanarayana, B. S. Nishtala
Assistant Directors - Battula Ramakrishna, J. Pulla Rao
Editing - Gautham Raju
Assistant Editor - Mutyala Naani
Art - Thota Tarani
Camera - S. Gopala Reddy
Associate Cameraman - M. V. Raghu
Assistant Cameramen - Diwakar, Srinivas Reddy

Soundtrack

External links
 
 Nelavanka film review at Telugu Cinema.com

1983 films
1980s Telugu-language films
Films directed by Jandhyala
Films scored by Ramesh Naidu